Ladislao is a given name, a Hispanic variant of Vladislav. Notable people with the name include:

 Ladislao Cabrera, Bolivian hero during the War of the Pacific
 Ladislao Diwa, Filipino patriot
 Ladislao Martínez, Puerto Rico musician
 László Kubala (1927–2002), Hungarian footballer, known as Ladislao Kubala in Spanish
 Ladislao Mazurkiewicz, Uruguyan former goalkeeper
 Ladislao Vajda, Hungarian film director

See also 
 Ladislao Cabrera Province, province in the Oruro Department, Bolivia
 Ladislaus (disambiguation)